Səmədabad (also, Samedabad) is a village and municipality in the Yevlakh Rayon of Azerbaijan.  It has a population of 1,877. The municipality consists of the villages of Səmədabad, İsmayılabad, and Bünyadabad.

References 

Populated places in Yevlakh District